McInnes is a surname. Notable people with the surname include:

Alan McInnes, Australian cricketer
Alison McInnes (born 1957), Scottish politician (Liberal Democrat MSP)
Andrew McInnes (born 1992), Australian rules footballer
Angus McInnes (fl. 1897–1903), Scottish football player (Burnley FC)
Cameron McInnes (born 1994), Australian Rugby League player
Charlie McInnes (born 1916), Australian rules footballer
Colin McInnes (disambiguation), several people:
Colin J. McInnes, health and foreign policy consultant, especially HIV/AIDS and security
Colin R. McInnes, Scottish engineer known for his work in solar sails
Derek McInnes (born 1971), Scottish football player and manager
Donald McInnes, later MacInnes (1824–1900), Canadian businessman and politician
Donald P. McInnes (born 1933), dairy farmer and political figure in Nova Scotia, Canada
Dugald McInnes (born 1877), Canadian sport shooter in the 1908 Summer Olympics
Gavin McInnes (born 1970), Canadian far-right commentator and Proud Boys founder
Geoff McInnes (born 1909), Australian rules footballer
George McInnes (born 1946), Australian rules footballer
Herman McInnes (1862–1923), politician in Alberta, Canada and Edmontona councillor
Hugh McInnes (1815–1879), Scottish recipient of the Victoria Cross
Ian McInnes (born 1967), Scottish footballer
James Campbell McInnes (1874–1945), English baritone singer and teacher
James McInnes (1901–1974), British Labour Member of Parliament (MP) for Glasgow Central
Joe McInnes (footballer) (born 1932), Scottish football player
John McInnes (disambiguation) various people:
John McInnes (Australian footballer) (1884–1950), Australian footballer
John McInnes (footballer, born 1923), Scottish footballer
John McInnes (footballer, born 1927) (1927–1973), Scottish footballer
John McInnes (politician) (1878–1950), South Australian politician from 1927 to 1950
John McInnes (ski jumper) (born 1939), Canadian ski jumper at the 1964 and 1968 Winter Olympics
Liz McInnes, British politician (Labour MP)
Lois Curfman McInnes, American applied mathematician
Mel McInnes (1915–1996), Australian cricket Test match umpire
Neil McInnes (Australian journalist) (1924–2017), Australian journalist and civil servant
Neil McInnes (politician) (1924–2005), Australian politician
Robin McInnes (born 1949), Isle of Wight authority on coastal processes
Stewart McInnes (born 1937), lawyer, arbitrator and former politician
Thomas Robert McInnes (1840–1904), Canadian physician and politician, Lt Governor of British Columbia
Tom McInnes (disambiguation), several people:
Tom McInnes (footballer, born 1869) (1869–1939), Scottish football player
Tom McInnes (footballer, born 1873) (1873–1937), Scottish football player
William McInnes (born 1963), Australian actor
William Beckwith McInnes (1889–1939), Australian portrait painter, multiple Archibald Prize winner
William C. McInnes (1923–2009), American Jesuit and academic
William Wallace Burns McInnes (1871–1954), Canadian politician, lawyer and Yukon's fifth Commissioner

See also
William Joseph McInnes Botanic Garden and Campus Arboretum, on the campus of Mills College in Oakland, California, USA
MacInnes
MacInnis